Toby Proctor is a Canadian voice, film and television actor. He voiced Darien/Tuxedo Mask in the English dub of the Sailor Moon anime in 54 episodes of the first two series. His other roles include Alex Flash Gordon in Flash Gordon and Copycat Ken in Ranma ½.

Filmography

Films
To Catch a Killer (1992) – Michael Kozenczak
Gregory K. (1993) – Russ Child #4
The Man in the Attic (1995) – Carl
Shadow Builder (1998) -– Harvey Price
White Lies (1998) – Chip
Dash and Lily (1999) – Flower Delivery Boy
In Too Deep (1999) – Red-Haired Cadet
Daydream Believers: The Monkee's Story (2000) – Auditioner #3
Feast of All Saints (2001) – Henri DeLande
Jewel (2001) – Gene
Danger Beneath the Sea (2001) – Seaman
Do or Die (2003) – Citizone Cop
Jasper, Texas (2003) – Sean Berry
Highwaymen (2004) – Rookie
The Skulls III (2004) – Sam Brooks
Childstar (2004) - Wade Keller – 1st A.D.
The Man (2005) – Cavity Search Guard
Dwags Playing Pooker (2008) – Bouncer
Yeah Rite (2012) – Father Lewis
Daisy: A Hen Into the Wild (2014) – Willie
Merry Matrimony (2015) – Phil

Television
T. and T. (1988) – Nick
By Way of the Stars (1992) – Franz
Beyond Reality (1993) – Bobby
Ranma ½ – Ken 'Copycat Ken'
The Mighty Jungle – Wayne
The Busy World of Richard Scarry (1994–1997) – Additional Voices
Ultraforce (1994–1995)
Sailor Moon (1995) – Tuxedo Mask (Episodes 12–65)
Road to Avonlea (1996) – Morgan Pettibone
Flash Gordon (1996) – Alex Flash Gordon
Police Academy: The Series (1997–1998) – Dirk Tackleberry
Mythic Warriors: Guardians and the Legend (1998–1999) – Telemachus, Soldier #2
Animorphs (1999) – Scottie
Blue Murder (2001) – Roommate
Earth: Final Conflict (2001) – Blake
Power Stone (2002)
Wild Card (2003) – Video Guy
Show Me Yours (2004) – Joe
The Bridge (2010) – Ross
Turbo Dogs (2010–2011)
XIII: The Series (2011) – Police Officer #2
Nikita (2013) – FBI Medic
Lost Girl (2013) – Pike
Alien Mysteries (2013) – Sergeant Pennison
Reign (2014) – Farmer
Heroes Reborn (2015) – Norris

Video games
Mega Man Legends 2 (2000) – Glyde

References

External links
 
 

Living people
Canadian male film actors
Canadian male television actors
Canadian male video game actors
Canadian male voice actors
Place of birth missing (living people)
Year of birth missing (living people)
20th-century Canadian male actors
21st-century Canadian male actors